Dierama is a genus of flowering plants in the family Iridaceae. Common names include hairbells, angel's fishing rod, fairybells, and wandflowers in English and grasklokkies (= grass-bells) in Afrikaans. They are native to Africa, with most occurring in the southern regions of the continent. The center of diversity is the province of KwaZulu-Natal in eastern South Africa.

Description
Plants of this genus are evergreen perennial herbs growing from large corms with fibrous tunics. The lowest two or three leaves are cataphylls that sheath the lower stem and become dry. The thin, wiry, branching stem may bend and droop when in flower. It is lined with leaves that have linear blades with thick longitudinal veins and often no midrib. The inflorescence is a panicle of several spikes of flowers. The spikes may hang like bells or grow erect. The bracts around the flowers are usually dry, thin, membranous, translucent, and streaked or veined with brown. The bell-shaped flowers of most wild species are pink; red, purple, yellow, and white taxa also exist. There are many cultivars in a range of colors, sometimes with spots of yellow or blue. The fruit is a spherical capsule.

Etymology
The genus name is derived from the Greek word dierama, meaning "funnel," and alludes to the flower shape.

Diversity
There are about 44 species.

Species include:
 Dierama adelphicum 
 Dierama ambiguum
 Dierama argyreum
 Dierama atrum
 Dierama cooperi
 Dierama cupuliflorum
Dierama densiflorum
 Dierama dissimile
 Dierama dracomontanum
 Dierama dubium
 Dierama elatum
 Dierama erectum
 Dierama floriferum
 Dierama formosum
 Dierama galpinii
 Dierama gracile
 Dierama grandiflorum
 Dierama igneum
 Dierama insigne
Dierama inyangense
 Dierama jucundum
 Dierama latifolium
Dierama longistylum
 Dierama luteoalbidum 
 Dierama medium
 Dierama mobile
 Dierama mossii
 Dierama nebrownii
 Dierama nixonianum
 Dierama pallidum
 Dierama palustre
Dierama parviflorum
 Dierama pauciflorum
 Dierama pendulum - angel's fishing rods, grassy bells, fairybell, hairbell, wedding bell
 Dierama pictum
Dierama plowesii
 Dierama pulcherrimum
 Dierama pumilum
 Dierama reynoldsii
 Dierama robustum
 Dierama sertum
 Dierama trichorhizum
 Dierama tyrium
 Dierama tysonii

Uses
Some species of dierama are cultivated as ornamental plants, such as the purple-pink-flowered D. pendulum. The South African endemic D. erectum is grown for the large, pink flowers it bears on tall, erect stems. It is prone to attack by the bean weevil Urodon lilii.

Certain species have been used in traditional African medicine and spiritual practices. D. erectum is used as an enema by the Sotho people and as a treatment for stomach problems. The corm of the plant is a fertility charm for bringing a good harvest.

Conservation
Some species, especially the narrow endemics, are decreasing in abundance due to loss of habitat. The South African natives D. ambiguum, D. erectum, and D. nixonianum are considered endangered species.

References

 
Iridaceae genera
Flora of Africa